Looking Glass is an American pop rock group of the early 1970s that was part of the Jersey Shore sound. Their 1972 song "Brandy (You're a Fine Girl)" was a #1 hit on both the Billboard Hot 100 and Cash Box Top 100 charts, remaining in the top position for one week.

Career
The group was formed in 1969, at Rutgers University in New Brunswick, New Jersey. The original version of the band broke up after college, with original members Elliot Lurie and Larry Gonsky recruiting two new members to form the classic Looking Glass lineup:
 Elliot Lurie (lead guitar and vocals)
 Jeff Grob (drums)
 Larry Gonsky (piano and vocals)
 Pieter Sweval (bass and vocals)

The group had the #1 hit single for the week of August 26, 1972 with "Brandy (You're a Fine Girl)", written by Lurie; and also a Top 40 hit "Jimmy Loves Mary-Anne" (1973), subsequently recorded by Josie Cotton. "Brandy (You're a Fine Girl)" was released in the US in June 1972. It topped the Billboard Hot 100 for one week and remained on the chart for 16 weeks. This disc, their only million seller, was certified gold by the RIAA on August 9, 1972.

Guitarist Brendan Harkin joined Looking Glass in early 1974, and Lurie left soon afterward to pursue a solo career, replaced by Michael Lee Smith, a singer from Georgia. Later that same year, the group changed its name to Fallen Angels. After Richie Ranno joined as second guitarist in September 1975, keyboardist Gonsky departed, and by late 1975, Fallen Angels's name had changed once again to Starz. Lurie appeared as a solo artist with "Your Love Song," an entry on Billboard's "Easy Listening" chart in 1974.

Sweval died on January 23, 1990, having succumbed to AIDS.

New York radio station WPLJ-FM reunited Looking Glass, along with several others acts as part of a "70s Reunion Concert" on March 24, 1995. It was held at the Theatre at Madison Square Garden.  Among the acts who took the stage at the sold-out concert were original lead singer Elliot Lurie and members of Looking Glass, Three Dog Night, Rupert Holmes, Andrew Gold, Alan O'Day, Ian Lloyd (lead singer of Stories), Sonny Geraci (lead singer of the Outsiders and Climax), and Robert John

In 2003, Lurie reconstituted the group with new musicians.

Discography

Albums

Singles

Notes

References

External links
 Lyrics to "Brandy (You're a Fine Girl)"

American pop music groups
Musical groups from New Jersey
Rutgers University alumni
Epic Records artists
Jersey Shore musical groups